Start It Up may refer to:
"Start It Up" (Shake It Up), an episode of Shake It Up

Music
"Start It Up", a song by Maceo Pinkard 1920
"Start It Up", a song by A Tribe Called Quest from The Love Movement 1998
"Start It Up" (song), a song by Lloyd Banks from H.F.M. 2 2010
"Start It Up", a song by Swedish singer September from Dancing Shoes
"Start It Up", a song by Christ Church Choir. 36th GMA Dove Awards
"Start It Up", a song by Noah23, Noah23 discography 2013
"Start It Up", a song by Australian band New Waver
"Start It Up", a song by Robben Ford from The Firm (Motion Picture Soundtrack) and album Robben Ford & the Blue Line
"Start It Up", a song by Charm City Devils written by Kevin Kadish
"Start It Up", a song by Richie Kotzen from Nothing to Lose (Forty Deuce album)
"Start It Up", a song by Dawn Tyler Watson from Saturday Night Blues: 20 Years
"Start It Up", a song by Fatback from So Delicious 1985